Henri Jean Paul Balinghasay Inting (born September 4, 1957) is an associate justice of the Supreme Court of the Philippines.  He was appointed by President Rodrigo Duterte replacing then-associate justice and then-chief justice Lucas Bersamin.

Education 

Inting received a Bachelor of Science degree in psychology at the University of San Carlos in Cebu City in 1978. He received a Bachelor of Laws degree at the Ateneo de Davao University in 1982, where he also finished his elementary and secondary education.

Career 
He was appointed to the Court of Appeals of the Philippines on September 14, 2012.

Supreme Court appointment 

In May 2019 Inting was appointed by President Rodrigo Duterte as an associate justice of the Supreme Court of the Philippines to replace then-associate justice Lucas Bersamin who was appointed Chief Justice of the Supreme Court of the Philippines on November 28, 2018.

References 

1957 births
Living people
Associate Justices of the Supreme Court of the Philippines
Ateneo de Davao University alumni
20th-century Filipino lawyers
Justices of the Court of Appeals of the Philippines
University of San Carlos alumni
21st-century Filipino judges